Rijswijk is a railway station located in Rijswijk in the suburbs of The Hague, Netherlands. The station was opened on 3 June 1847 and is located on the Amsterdam–Rotterdam railway, between The Hague and Rotterdam. It was later enlarged, and then closed in 1938. In 1965 it opened in a different location.

The station has been in a tunnel since 1996, with four tracks and four platforms. The northern entrance is a modern glass pyramid protruding from the ground, not unlike that of the Louvre, while the southern entrance, on Winston Churchilllaan, is combined with a local bus and tram station.

In May 2016, traveling organisation Rover held a survey in which Rijswijk came in as the most uncomfortable railway station in the Netherlands.

Train services
The following services currently call at Rijswijk:
2x per hour local service (sprinter) The Hague - Rotterdam - Dordrecht - Breda
2x per hour local service (sprinter) The Hague - Rotterdam - Dordrecht - Roosendaal

References

External links
NS website 
Dutch Public Transport journey planner 

Railway stations in South Holland
Railway stations opened in 1847
Railway stations on the Oude Lijn
Railway stations located underground in the Netherlands
Buildings and structures in Rijswijk
1847 establishments in the Netherlands
Railway stations in the Netherlands opened in 1847